Joey Camen (born January 16, 1957) is an American voice actor, comedian and writer who has performed voice over work in various movies, TV shows and video games.

Early life
Camen is of Russian and Romanian Jewish ancestry. His father, Hyman Camen was an upholstery furniture salesman and carpet salesman. His mother, Dorothy (née Aronovitz) Camen, a part-time bindery worker. Joey was going to be named Jack, however, his grandfather Joseph on his father’s side, died on the morning of his birth. His parents quickly changed his name to that of his dearly departed grandpa.

Biography
In 1974, after graduating from Henry Ford High School in Detroit, Camen went to Hollywood, California. He auditioned at the Comedy Store on the Sunset Strip, and within a few weeks, he was a regular performer and master of ceremonies, making him one of the youngest professional standup comedians at the time. His standup act featured various dialects along with characters he created based on the people he grew up with in multi-ethnic Detroit. He was then discovered and mentored by voiceover artist Daws Butler, who voiced the characters of Yogi Bear, Huckleberry Hound, Quick Draw McGraw and others.

Camen got his first break at 20 performing his standup comedy routines on national TV shows Don Kirshner’s Rock Concert and later on Dinah, the daytime talk show starring Dinah Shore. He was also the opening act for such performers as Oingo Boingo, The Pointer Sisters, Richard Pryor, Marvin Gaye, and others. In addition to being a regular performer at the Comedy Store for more than 25 years, Camen has headlined at comedy venues in Las Vegas and comedy clubs and colleges across the United States.

As a voice-over actor, Camen has worked on multiple projects over the years, including video games Devil May Cry 5, Skylanders: Giants, Transformers: Dark of the Moon and Mafia II; the online series Sam & Max, where he voiced two seasons as Bosco and the entire Jimmy 2 Teeth family.

He has voiced multiple characters on animated family films such as The Queen's Corgi, The Son of Bigfoot, Thunder and the House of Magic, and Space Jam as Bang the Monstar. Joey has also voiced spots for various TV and radio commercials and was the voice of Natural Smurf in the Hanna-Barbera TV series, The Smurfs. In addition, Camen is the designated voice of McGruff the Crime Dog for a series of videos shown in public schools throughout the United States and PSA commercials.

As an actor, Camen’s first job was as a sketch player on the short-lived NBC variety series, The Richard Pryor Show, where he performed sketches alongside Richard Pryor and other cast members. Then as a pledge in Floyd Mutrux’s The Hollywood Knights, and next co-starring in the PBS television series, The Righteous Apples, for 2 seasons as Samuel 'DC' Rosencrantz. This led to working with Ralph Bakshi on his films, American Pop and Cool World, as well as guest roles in sitcoms and other feature films.

In 1994 Joey wrote and performed a serio-comic one-person, two-act play, In the Hood with Mrs. Aronovitz. The premise was simple: An ungrateful son tricks his elderly mother out of the deed to her apartment building in order to tear it down and put up a parking lot. Mrs. Aronovitz and her tenants rally together to get the building back. Camen portrayed 9 diverse characters. The play had a successful run in theatres in Los Angeles and New York City.

Camen's filmmaking credits include the Houston International Film Festival Bronze Award-Winning comedy short Bernie - A Love Story about a man and his mattress, in which he worn multiple hats as writer-director-producer and actor. Joey has also directed various YouTube videos for his comedy channel CamenTV.

Author
Joey has written two non-fiction books. The 2013 pet memoir, My Life with Snoopy: How One Shelter Dog's Love Changed a Man's Life and Other Tails of Adventure, which tells the story of his 13-year relationship with his Burbank Animal Shelter dog, Snoopy. And his 2017 autobiography, Laughing Through the Pain: Stories from the Trenches of Hollywood Standup Comedy and Beyond.

Filmography

Animation
 American Pop - Freddie
 Becca's Bunch - Buck, MJ
 Cool World - Interrogator #1, Slash, Holli's door
 Creepy Crawlers - Chris Carter
 Darkwing Duck - Stegmutt
 Dink, the Little Dinosaur - Additional voices
 Iznogoud - Additional voices
 Jason and the Heroes of Mount Olympus - Additional voices
 Last Days of Coney Island - 
 Little Dracula - Werebunny
 Little Wizards - Various voices
 Monster Island - Shiro, Fergus, Mayor's Assistant
 My Little Pony - Weston the Baby Eagle
 Phantom Boy - Le géant
 Problem Child - Additional voices
 Robinson Crusoe - Scrubby
 Shirt Tales - Additional voices
 Space Jam - Monstar Bang
 Spicy City - Max
 Strange Frame: Love & Sax - Police Officer (uncredited)
 Superman - Short Henchman
 The Glo Friends - Unknown voice/s
 The House of Magic - Chihuahua
 The Queen's Corgi - Tyson, Al
 The Smurfs - Natural Smurf (Adult)
 The Son of Bigfoot - Principal Jones
 The Swan Princess II: Escape from Castle Mountain - Knuckles
 What-a-Mess - Additional voices

Video games

 3-D Dinosaur Adventure - Additional voices
 America's Next Top Model - Additional voices
 Asura's Wrath - Taison 
 Champions Online - Armadillo, Mechaniste
 Command & Conquer: Red Alert 3 - Imperial Tsunami Tank & Allied Javelin Soldier (uncredited)
 Drakensang: The Dark Eye - Merwin Goodbeet, Merchants, Soldiers, Guards
 EverQuest II - Additional voices
 EverQuest II: Desert of Flames - Additional voices
 Gothic 3 - Additional voices
 Guardians of Middle-earth - Additional voices (as Joseph Camen)
 Guild Wars - additional voices
 Hitman: Absolution - Chester the Bum, Landlord (uncredited)
 Jade Empire - Additional voices
 Men of Valor - White Marine 2, Pilot
 Saints Row - Stilwater's Resident
 Shattered Steel - Additional voices
 Skylanders: Giants - Terrafin, additional voices
 Skylanders: Imaginators - Terrafin, Free Ranger, additional voices
 Skylanders: SuperChargers - Terrafin, Free Ranger, additional voices
 Skylanders: Swap Force - Terrafin, Free Ranger, additional voices
 Skylanders: Trap Team - Terrafin, Free Ranger, additional voices
 Superman Returns - Additional voices
 The Sopranos: Road to Respect - Additional voices
 Tony Hawk's American Wasteland - Additional voices
 Tournament of Legends - Additional voices
 Transformers: Dark of the Moon - Additional voices
 Ultimate Spider-Man - Additional voices

Live-action
 Adventures in Voice Acting - Himself
 Auditions - Black - White Man
 Can I Do It 'Till I Need Glasses? - Himself
 Fairy Tales - Little Dutch Boy
 Growing Pains - Slash
 King of the Mountain - Suds
 Project A - Additional voices
 Rock Concert - Himself
 The Hollywood Knights - Pledge
 The Richard Pryor Show - Various, White Guy Who Wants to Be Black
 The Righteous Apples - Samuel 'DC' Rosencrantz
 The Steve Harvey Show - Himself

Anime
 Black Jack - GNN Newscaster
 Black Jack: The Movie - GNN Newscaster
 Dinozaurs - Dino Tricera
 El Hazard: The Magnificent World - Walla
 Eureka Seven - Dr. Greg Egan
 Ghost in the Shell: S.A.C. 2nd GIG - Additional voices
 Ghost in the Shell: Stand Alone Complex - Watanabe
 Phantom Boy - The Big Guy
 Samurai Champloo - Kuroihara, Kogoro

Shorts
 Last Days of Coney Island - Men
 My Secret Friend: A Guardian Angel Story - Additional voices (as Reed Waxman)

Controversy
Joey Camen was criticized by video game fans who had discovered his YouTube channel Camen TV in where he played various offensive stereotypes. The videos were posted between 2015 and 2017. The videos were later taken down by Camen in 2019.

References

External links
 
 
 

American male writers
Living people
Place of birth missing (living people)
American male film actors
American male television actors
American stand-up comedians
American male voice actors
1957 births